Count of Ericeira (Conde da Ericeira) was a title created by King Philip III of Portugal, through a 1 March 1622 letter in favour of Diogo de Menezes (1553–1625).

Diogo de Menezes (1622–1625); 1st Count of Ericeira
Fernando de Meneses, 2nd Count of Ericeira (1614–1699); 2nd Count of Ericeira
Luís de Meneses (1632–1690); 3rd Count of Ericeira.
Francisco Xavier de Meneses (1673–1743); 4th Count of Ericeira.
Luís Carlos Inácio Xavier de Meneses, 1st Marquis of Louriçal (1689–1742); 5th Count of Ericeira.
Henrique de Meneses, 3rd Marquis of Louriçal

See also
Count

 
1622 establishments in Portugal